Bolyarovo is a small town in Yambol Province, located not far from the border with Turkey. It is the administrative centre of the homonymous Bolyarovo Municipality. As of December 2009, the town has a population of 1,303 inhabitants.

During the Ottoman rule it was called Paşaköy.

References

Towns in Bulgaria
Populated places in Yambol Province